Nursing theory is defined as "a creative and rigorous structuring of ideas that project a tentative, purposeful, and systematic view of phenomena". Through systematic inquiry, whether in nursing research or practice, nurses are able to develop knowledge relevant to improving the care of patients. Theory refers to "a coherent group of general propositions used as principles of explanation".

Nursing theory

Importance

In the early part of nursing's history, there was little formal nursing knowledge.  As nursing education developed, the need to categorize knowledge led to development of nursing theory to help nurses evaluate increasingly complex client care situations.

Nursing theories give a plan for reflection in which to examine a certain direction in where the plan needs to head. As new situations are encountered, this framework provides an arrangement for management, investigation and decision-making. Nursing theories also administer a structure for communicating with other nurses and with other representatives and members of the health care team. Nursing theories assist the development of nursing in formulating beliefs, values and goals. They help to define the different particular contribution of nursing with the care of clients. Nursing theory guides research and practice.

Borrowed and shared theories 
Not all theories in nursing are unique nursing theories; many are borrowed or shared with other disciplines. Theories developed by Neuman, Watson, Parse, Orlando and Peplau are considered unique nursing theories. Theories and concepts that originated in related sciences have been borrowed by nurses to explain and explore phenomena specific to nursing.

Types

Grand nursing theories
Grand nursing theories have the broadest scope and present general concepts and propositions. Theories at this level may both reflect and provide insights useful for practice but are not designed for empirical testing. This limits the use of grand nursing theories for directing, explaining, and predicting nursing in particular situations. However, these theories may contain concepts that can lend themselves to empirical testing. Theories at this level are intended to be pertinent to all instances of nursing. Grand theories consist of conceptual frameworks defining broad perspectives for practice and ways of looking at nursing phenomena based on the perspectives.

Mid-range nursing theories
Middle-range nursing theories are narrower in scope than grand nursing theories and offer an effective bridge between grand nursing theories and nursing practice. They present concepts and a lower level of abstraction and guide theory-based research and nursing practice strategies. One of the hallmarks of mid-range theory compared to grand theories is that mid-range theories are more tangible and verifiable through testing. The functions of middle-range theories includes to describe, explain, or predict phenomenon.  Middle-range theories are simple, straightforward, general, and consider a limited number of variables and limited aspect of reality.

Nursing practice theories
Nursing practice theories have the most limited scope and level of abstraction and are developed for use within a specific range of nursing situations. Nursing practice theories provide frameworks for nursing interventions, and predict outcomes and the impact of nursing practice. The capacity of these theories is limited, and analyzes a narrow aspect of a phenomenon. Nursing practice theories are usually defined to an exact community or discipline.

Nursing models
Nursing models are usually described as a representation of reality or a more simple way of organising a complex phenomenon. The nursing model is a consolidation of both concepts and the assumption that combine them into a meaningful arrangement.
A model is a way of presenting a situation in such a way that it shows the logical terms in order to showcase the structure of the original idea. The term nursing model cannot be used interchangeably with nursing theory.

Components of nursing modeling

There are three main key components to a nursing model:

Statement of goal that the nurse is trying to achieve
Set of beliefs and values
Awareness, skills and knowledge the nurse needs to practice.

The first important step in development of ideas about nursing is to establish the body approach essential to nursing, then to analyse the beliefs and values around those.

Common concepts of nursing modeling: a metaparadigm

A metaparadigm contains philosophical worldviews and concepts that are unique to a discipline and defines boundaries that separate it from other disciplines. A metaparadigm is intended to help guide others to conduct research and utilize the concepts for academia within that discipline. The nursing metaparadigm consist of four main concepts: person, health, environment, and nursing.

The person (Patient)
The environment
Health
Nursing (Goals, Roles Functions)

Each theory is regularly defined and described by a Nursing Theorist. The main focal point of nursing out of the four various common concepts is the person (patient).

Notable nursing theorists and theories
 Anne Casey: Casey's model of nursing
 Betty Neuman: Neuman systems model
Callista Roy: Adaptation model of nursing
 Carl O. Helvie: Helvie energy theory of nursing and health
Dorothea Orem: Self-care deficit nursing theory
 Faye Abdellah: Patient-centered approach to Nursing
 Helen Erickson
 Hildegard Peplau: Theory of interpersonal relations
Imogene King
 Isabel Hampton Robb
 Kari Martinsen Adequate care must involve both objective observation and perceptive response.
 Katharine Kolcaba: Theory of Comfort
Madeleine Leininger
 Katie Love: Empowered Holistic Nursing Education
 Marie Manthey: Primary Nursing
Martha E. Rogers: Science of unitary human beings
Ramona T Mercer: Maternal role attainment theory
Virginia Henderson: Henderson's need theory
 Jean Watson
Nancy Roper, Winifred W. Logan, and Alison J. Tierney: Roper-Logan-Tierney model of nursing
 Phil Barker: Tidal Model

Purposely omitted from this list is Florence Nightingale. Nightingale never actually formulated a theory of nursing science but was posthumously accredited with formulating some by others who categorized her personal journaling and communications into a theoretical framework.

Also not included are the many nurses who improved on these theorists' ideas without developing their own theoretical vision.

See also

 Nursing
 Nursing assessment
 Nursing process
 Nursing research

References

Nursing theory - history and modernity. Prominent theories of nursing.
Nursing Theories - a companion to nursing theories and models
Nursing Theory and Theorists

External links
 Nursing Theory Page
 Nursing Theories and Sub-Theories
 Nurses.info
 Nightingale's Notes on Nursing at project Gutenberg